The 2014–15 season is Hull City's second season back in the Premier League after retaining their league status with their highest points total and highest finishing position of 16th in the 2013–14 season. They also competed in the League Cup and the FA Cup. As losing FA Cup finalists in the 2013–14 season they also took part in the UEFA Europa League and started in the Third qualifying round.

Kits
On 20 April 2014, 24-minutes into the home match against Arsenal, the club announced they had signed a 4-year deal with kit suppliers Umbro to commence 1 June 2014. On 17 July 2014 the club announced a record breaking two-year shirt sponsorship deal with 12BET. The new home kit design was revealed on 18 July 2014, the away kit on 11 August 2014 and a third strip on 20 August 2014.

Events

The season's fixtures were announced on 18 June 2014, giving City an opening away tie against Queens Park Rangers on 16 August 2014. The season closes on 24 May 2015 with a home match against Manchester United.

On 20 June 2014, the club unveiled a new crest which did not include the name of the team.

On 25 June 2014, Jake Livermore was signed from Tottenham Hotspur for an undisclosed club record fee on a three-year contract. The BBC reported the fee was thought to be about £8 million.

 On 30 June 2014, Robert Snodgrass was signed from Norwich City for an undisclosed fee, believed to be in excess of £6 million, on a three-year contract.
 On 7 July 2014 Tom Ince was signed from Blackpool on a two-year contract. The free transfer was made with compensation to Blackpool still to be agreed.
 On 7 July 2014 Joe Dudgeon signed a new one-year contract with the club.

 On 9 July 2014, goalkeeper Eldin Jakupović signed a new two-year contract with the club.

 On 28 July 2014, Hibernian signed Mark Oxley on a six-month loan, with a view to extending to the end of the season. This was extended to a season long loan on 8 January 2015.
 On 29 July 2014, the club made a double signing on three-year deals of Harry Maguire, for £2.5 million from Sheffield United, and Andy Robertson, for £2.85 million from Dundee United. On the same day, Conor Townsend moved to Dundee United on a season-long loan, but returned early on 3 February 2015.

 On 31 July 2014, Joe Dudgeon signed a month-long loan agreement with Barnsley, this was later extended to 5 January 2015.
 On 14 August 2014, Shane Long signed for Southampton for an undisclosed fee, reported by the BBC to be about £12 million.
 On 20 August 2014, manager Steve Bruce confirmed that Robert Snodgrass would be out for six months due to a knee injury sustained at Queens Park Rangers on 16 August.

 On 26 August 2014, Michael Dawson joined from Tottenham Hotspur for £3.5 million on a three-year deal.
 On transfer deadline day, 1 September 2014, defender Brian Lenihan was signed on a three-year deal from Cork City, for an undisclosed fee. George Boyd moved to Burnley on a three-year contract. Abel Hernández of Palermo signed a three-year deal for a club record transfer fee, reported by the BBC to be about £10 million. Mohamed Diamé moved from West Ham United after signing a three-year deal with the club. Gastón Ramírez was brought in from Southampton and Hatem Ben Arfa from Newcastle United, both on season-long loan deals.
 On 9 September 2014, a press conference was called by owner Assem Allam for 2:00 p.m. on 11 September to discuss "the future of Hull City Tigers". At the press conference, Allam confirmed that following The FA's rejection of the name change on 9 April 2014, he had put the club up for sale and would be appealing to the Court of Arbitration for Sport (CAS) over the name change. On 16 March 2015, an independent panel ruled that the original decision by The FA "cannot stand" and the club were free to reapply for a name change for next season.

On 30 September 2014, Yannick Sagbo went on an emergency three-month loan to Wolverhampton Wanderers, but was recalled early on 13 November 2014.
On 21 October 2014, Maynor Figueroa returned to Wigan Athletic on a month-loan; this was later extended to 30 December 2014. He was recalled early on 22 December 2014 to cover for injuries.
On 30 October 2014, Tom Ince went on loan to Nottingham Forest until 28 December 2014, but was recalled early on 22 December 2014 to cover for injuries.
On 7 November 2014, Brian Lenihan went out on a month-long loan spell to Blackpool, but this was cut short on 25 November 2014 with a tendon injury.
On 20 November 2014, Will Aimson and Calaum Jahraldo-Martin went on loan to Tranmere Rovers until 1 January 2015. Though Aimson returned after the match on 28 November 2014 where he suffered a broken tibia and fibula.
On 21 November 2014, the club announced that Burgess Hill Town striker Greg Luer would be joining on 1 January 2015.
On 5 December 2014, UEFA announced that the club was under investigation for possible breaches of the UEFA Financial Fair Play Regulations. In February 2015, the club were fined £145,000 for breaching the rules.

 On 23 December 2014, Steve Agnew left the club to become assistant head coach of Middlesbrough.

 On 5 January 2015, Hatem Ben Arfa signed for French side Nice after being out of favour and leaving without telling the club his whereabouts.
 On 23 January 2015, Karim Rossi moved on a free transfer to Belgian side Zulte Waregem.
 On 27 January 2015, Calaum Jahraldo-Martin signed for Scottish Championship club Alloa Athletic on loan until the end of the 2014–15 season.
 On 30 January 2015, it was announced that Dean Windass would become the club ambassador on 2 February, the first official appointment to this role.

 On transfer deadline day, 2 February 2015, Tom Ince moved on loan to Derby County for the remainder of the season and Greg Luer moved on a month-long loan to Port Vale. They also signed Senegal striker Dame N'Doye from Lokomotiv Moscow for an undisclosed fee on a two-and-a-half-year contract.
 On 5 February 2015 Mike Phelan was appointed as assistant manager.

 On 10 February 2015, Harry Maguire went on a month-long loan to Wigan Athletic, this was later extended until the end of the season.
 On 28 February 2015, Conor Townsend went on a month-long loan to Scunthorpe United, which was later extended to the end of the season.
 On 11 March 2015, the club confirmed that a new contract had been agreed with manager Steve Bruce, a three-year deal that was signed later.

 On 13 March 2015, Johnny Margetts went on loan to Cambridge United for the rest of the season.
 On 19 March 2015, it was reported that Nikica Jelavić would be out for six-weeks after knee surgery.

 On 15 May 2015, Jake Livermore was suspended by the club following a positive test for cocaine, and would not play again in the 2014–15 season.

 On 28 May 2015, the club released six players, Joe Dudgeon, Maynor Figueroa, Steve Harper, Paul McShane, Liam Rosenior and Yannick Sagbo, who were all out of contract at the end of the season.

 On 19 June 2015, Conor Townsend signed a one-year contract extension.

Awards
The awards ceremony for the season was originally planned for 24 May 2015, but this was postponed to a date in July 2015.

Players

First team squad

Out on loan

Squad detail

Transfers
This section only lists transfers and loans for the 2014–15 season, which began 1 July 2014. For transactions in May and June 2014, see transfers and loans for the 2013–14 season.

Players in 

Notes

Players out 

Notes

Loans in

Loans out

Statistics

Captains

Appearances

|-
|colspan="14"|Players who played for Hull City but were subsequently sold by the club:

Note: Appearances shown after a "+" indicate player came on during course of match.

Disciplinary record

Top scorers

Competitions

Pre-season
Pre-season matches were announced on 19 May 2014 with two matches at the same time on 21 July 2014 against North Ferriby United and Harrogate Town. This to be followed by matches against York City on 23 July and Barnsley on 26 July.

Players reported back for pre-season training on 8 July 2014 and departed for a training camp in Portugal later in the week.

On 8 July 2014, a pre-season friendly against VfB Stuttgart was announced for 10 August 2014 at the Mercedes-Benz Arena in Stuttgart, Germany.

Overall

Premier League

League table

Results summary

Result by matchday

Matches
The fixtures for the 2014–15 season were announced on 18 June 2014 at 9 am.

League Cup

Hull City enter the competition at the Third Round; because of their involvement in European competition, matches were played during the week commencing 22 September 2014. The draw for the Third Round took place on 27 August 2014 and Hull were drawn away to follow Premier League side West Bromwich Albion. The match took place on 24 September 2014 at The Hawthorns, and Brown Ideye opened the scoring after 15 minutes for West Brom. Hull fought back with goals either side of the break from Tom Ince and Robbie Brady, but the home team took it with two goals in the last four minutes of the match from Gareth McAuley  and Saido Berahino.

FA Cup

Hull City enter the competition at the Third Round Proper stage with matches taking place in early January 2015. The draw for the Third Round Proper takes place at 7 pm on 8 December 2014 at The Deep in Hull and broadcast live on BBC Two. The first match drawn was Hull away to Arsenal in a repeat of the 2014 FA Cup Final. The match was shown live by the BBC. Arsenal opened the scoring through Per Mertesacker on the 20-minute mark but failed to make further progress until Alexis Sánchez double the score with ten minutes remaining. City made no reply and were knocked out, with Arsenal winning 2–0.

UEFA Europa League

Hull City enter the competition in the Third qualifying round, the draw for which took place on 18 July 2014 at UEFA headquarters in Nyon, Switzerland. Hull City were drawn against either AS Trenčín or Vojvodina, with the away-leg being played on 31 July 2014 and the return leg on 7 August 2014. On 24 July 2014, Trenčín won the match 4–3 on aggregate and become City's opponents in the Third Qualifying round. The away match would be played at the Štadión pod Dubňom, Žilina, Slovakia. The away-leg took place on 31 July 2014 and was Steve Bruce's 100th game in charge of the team. The match ended in a 0–0 draw, with Tom Huddlestone having a penalty saved and firing the rebound against the bar. The home leg on 7 August 2014 at the KC Stadium got off to a quick start for the visitors, with Tomáš Malec netting in two-minutes of the start. Ahmed Elmohamady equalised after 27-minutes, and on the 80th minute mark substitute Sone Aluko won the game for City. Hull were in the draw for the next round that took place on 8 August 2014. Hull were drawn against Belgian team Lokeren with the first-leg to be played 21 August at the Daknamstadion stadium in Daknam with the return leg at the KC Stadium on 28 August 2014. The first-leg was a narrow 1–0 win by Lokeren with a goal scored by Hans Vanaken that followed a goalkeeping error by Allan McGregor. The match was marred by some violence after the match in which some fans from both sides were arrested. The following week at the KC Stadium Hull made the perfect start with Robbie Brady opening the scoring after just 6 minutes. Soon after the break Jordan Remacle levelled the scores, but a penalty was awarded to Hull after 55-minutes and Brady scored his second goal of the match. After 71 minutes, Yannick Sagbo was dismissed following a challenge on Georgios Galitsios. Though Hull won 2–1 on the night, producing an aggregate score of 2–2, Lokeren progressed under the away goals rule.

Notes

References

Hull City A.F.C. seasons
Hull City
2010s in Kingston upon Hull